Jigme Rinpoche can refer to one of the following Tibetan Buddhist lamas:

Lama Jigme Rinpoche (Kagyu) or Jigme Rinpoche, of the Karma Kagyu school
Taklung Ma Rinpoche, Tenzin Kunzang Jigme Rinpoche
Jigme Phuntsok (1933–2004), Nyingma lama from Sertha Region
 Jigme Lhundup Rinpoche